Alvarado I (former La Risca project) is a large solar thermal power station in Alvarado, province of Badajoz, in Extremadura, Spain. Construction on the plant commenced in December 2007 and was completed in July 2009, when commercial operations began.

A second  facility, Alvarado II, is currently on the proposal stage. It is planned to be constructed in the same area as Alvarado I.

See also 

 List of power stations in Spain
 List of solar thermal power stations

References 

Solar thermal energy
Solar power stations in Spain
Buildings and structures in Extremadura
Energy in Extremadura